Piotrowski (feminine: Piotrowska, plural: Piotrowscy) is a Polish surname derived from the masculine given name Piotr (Peter). The name, and its variations indicate a family's origin as being from a town, such as for instance Piotrów and Piotrowo, or a toponym (place name) deriving from a holding, manor or estate. Variants and related names include Piotrowicz, Piotrowiak, Piotrowsky, Pietrowski, Pietrkowski, Pietrowsky, and Pietrowiak.

This surname is mainly found in Poland and Russia and the former territories of the Polish–Lithuanian Commonwealth. It is particularly widespread in Poland, where it is the 19th most common surname, with 61,844 bearers in 2009. Descendants of certain noble families, including that of a minor Tatar Knyaz that most likely had Naiman-Beg's youngest son, also bear the name or variations thereof. Comital and baronial branches exist as well. The earliest recorded usage of the surname can be traced back to the 11th century.

Heraldry 
Various noble coats of arms have been associated with the Piotrowski family. The name has been associated with the Abdank, Belina, Ginwiłł, Gozdawa, Jastrzębiec, Junosza, Korwin, Kotwica, Leliwa, Lis, Nieczuja, Poraj, Prus, Przerowa, Rawa, Ślepowron, and Świnka coats of arms.

Podlasie 
According to Polish heraldist Kasper Niesiecki (1682–1744), families bearing Piotr-derived surnames living in the region formerly known as Podlasie were often represented by the Gozdawa coat of arms. Notable members of this branch include Piotr Piotrowski, parliamentary representative in 1591, and Dr. Łukasz Piotrowski of the Academy of Cracow and author of Grammaticarum institutionum libros 4. Cracov. in 4to.

Grand Duchy of Lithuania 
Families with these surnames living in the Grand Duchy of Lithuania and the area surrounding Drohiczyn bore the Junosza coat of arms. Some notable personalities who bore this coat of arms include:
 Aleksander z Trojan Piotrowski, Borough Scriptor (pisarz grodzki) of Ashmyany and Sejm tax collector (1618)
 Stanisław Piotrowski, Crown and Lithuanian Treasury Clerk (pisarz skarbowy koronny i litewski) (1632)
 Jakub Piotrowski, Podstoli of Lublin

Bearers
 Agnieszka Piotrowska (born 1964), Polish filmmaker
 Antoni Piotrowski (Bulgarian: Антони Пьотровски, Antoni Pyotrovski; 1853–1924), Polish painter
 Bernadeta Bocek-Piotrowska (born 1970), Polish cross country skier
  Charles Piotrowski Jr (Born 1974)  American Police Officer and Downhill Skier
 Damian Piotrowski (born 1987), Polish footballer
 Edward W. Piotrowski (born 1955), Polish physicist
 Gosia Piotrowska, Polish television actress
 Irene Piotrowski (born 1941), Canadian athlete
 John L. Piotrowski (born 1934), U.S. Air Force general
 Józef Piotrowski (1840–1923), Russian enlightener
 Kathrin Piotrowski (born 1980), German badminton player
 Lillian Piotrowski (1911-1974), American politician
 Luke Piotrowski, American screenwriter
 Jakub Piotrowski (born 1997), Polish footballer
 Marek Piotrowski (born 1964), Polish kickboxer and boxer
  (1813-1875), Polish painter
 Mirosław Piotrowski (born 1966), Polish politician
 
 Paweł Piotrowski (born 1985), Polish Paralympic athlete
 Robert Piotrowski (born 1963), American architect
 Rachel Piotrowski, Canadian ice hockey player
 Ryszard Piotrowski (born 1924), Polish war hero
 Sebastian Piotrowski (born 1990), German-Polish footballer
 
 Tatjana Piotrowski, German molecular geneticist
 Teresa Piotrowska (born 1955), Polish politician
 
 Zofia Piotrowska mother of Ivan Kalyayev
 Zygmunt A. Piotrowski (1904-1985), Polish born, American psychologist

See also 
 Wólka Piotrowska, a village in Podlaskie Voivodeship in Poland

References

External links
 

Polish-language surnames
Polish noble families
Lithuanian noble families